Dylan (born 6 January 2016) is a pet dog owned by Alberto Fernández, the current president of Argentina, and his domestic partner, Fabiola Yáñez. Dylan is a rough collie, and was named after American singer-songwriter Bob Dylan, whom President Fernández admires.

Life
Dylan was born in Pilar, in Buenos Aires Province, on 6 January 2016. After being adopted by Alberto Fernández and his domestic partner, Fabiola Yáñez, Dylan moved to the couple's home in the Puerto Madero neighborhood of Buenos Aires. He was named after Bob Dylan, whom Fernández has praised and cited as an inspiration in different occasions. In 2019, mere months before the announcement of Fernández's candidacy for the 2019 presidential election, an Instagram account was set up for Dylan; the account quickly became popular and, as of March 2020, counts with over 200 thousand followers.

Dylan became a recognizable feature of Fernández's campaign. The collie was present in Fernández's first campaign spot ahead of the 2019 primaries, and both Fernández and Yáñez shared photos with their pet dog in their social media accounts throughout the campaign.

Following Alberto Fernández's victory at the 2019 presidential election, Dylan and his then-only son, Prócer, moved to the Quinta de Olivos, the private residence of the Argentine president.

Offspring
Dylan fathered four pups born in July 2019; only one of these pups was kept by the Fernández household, a male. Dylan's son was named Prócer, in a reference to The Simpsons episode "The Canine Mutiny", which features a collie named Laddie ("Prócer", in the Latin American Spanish dub), itself a parody of another collie dog, Lassie; the name was suggested by Fernández's child. An Instagram account for Prócer was later created as well, and as of April 2020, Dylan's son has over 65 thousand followers.

In June 2020, Dylan fathered a female, which was named Kaila.

References

External links

2016 animal births
Individual dogs in politics
Alberto Fernández